Syrmoptera is a genus of butterflies in the family Lycaenidae. They are found in the Afrotropical realm.

Species
Syrmoptera amasa (Hewitson, 1869)
Syrmoptera bonifacei Stempffer, 1961
Syrmoptera caritas Libert, 2004
Syrmoptera homeyerii (Dewitz, 1879)
Syrmoptera melanomitra Karsch, 1895
Syrmoptera mixtura (Hulstaert, 1924)

References

Theclinae
Lycaenidae genera
Taxa named by Ferdinand Karsch